This is a list of marae (Māori meeting grounds) in the Bay of Plenty Region of New Zealand.

In October 2020, the Government committed $29,614,993 through the Provincial Growth Fund to upgrade 77 marae in the region, with the intention of creating 648 jobs.

Western Bay of Plenty District

Tauranga City

Mōtītī Island

Rotorua Lakes District

Kawerau District

Whakatane District

Opotiki District

See also
 Lists of marae in New Zealand
 List of schools in the Bay of Plenty Region

References

Bay of Plenty Region, List of marae in the
Marae
Marae in the Bay of Plenty Region, List of